The 2022 Asian Weightlifting Championships was held in Manama, Bahrain from 6 to 16 October 2022. It was the 50th men's and 31st women's championship.

Medal summary

Men

Women

Medal table 

Ranking by Big (Total result) medals 

Ranking by all medals: Big (Total result) and Small (Snatch and Clean & Jerk)

Team ranking

Men

Women

Participating nations 
183 athletes from 28 nations competed.

 (4)
 (5)
 (2)
 (8)
 (20)
 (13)
 (16)
 (17)
 (3)
 (1)
 (2)
 (18)
 (3)
 (1)
 (2)
 (4)
 (3)
 (2)
 (1)
 (11)
 (2)
 (2)
 (5)
 (12)
 (1)
 (15)
 (7)
 (3)

Men's results

55 kg

61 kg

67 kg

73 kg

81 kg

89 kg

96 kg

102 kg

109 kg

+109 kg

Women's results

45 kg

49 kg

55 kg

59 kg

64 kg

71 kg

76 kg

81 kg

87 kg

+87 kg

References

External links 
 Results Book
 Start Book

Asian Weightlifting Championships
Asian Weightlifting Championships
Weightlifting
Asian Weightlifting Championships
International weightlifting competitions hosted by Bahrain
Sport in Manama
Asian Weightlifting Championships